Derocephalus is a genus of cactus flies in the family Neriidae.

Distribution
Australia.

Species
Derocephalus angusticollis Enderlein, 1922

References

Nerioidea genera
Taxa named by Günther Enderlein
Neriidae
Diptera of Australasia